The 2010 Invercargill mayoral election finished on Saturday, 9 October 2010 and was conducted under the First Past the Post system using the postal voting system. It was held as part of the 2010 New Zealand local elections.

Background
The candidates for mayor included the incumbent Tim Shadbolt who contested a sixth consecutive term. Other candidates included Suzanne Prentice and Carl Heenan. Prentice decided to run after Shadbolt had offered her the position of deputy mayor in December 2009. Tim Shadbolt won the mayoral election and won a sixth term as Mayor of Invercargill, making him one of the longest-serving mayors in New Zealand.

Results
The following table gives the election results:

References

2010 elections in New Zealand
Mayoral elections in Invercargill
October 2010 events in New Zealand